Daryl McKenzie (born 1962) is an Australian musical director, composer and trombonist.

McKenzie has directed the Daryl McKenzie Jazz Orchestra since 1992 playing with artists such as Bill Watrous., James Morrison (musician), and Wilbur Wilde. He was Musical Director for the television show Hey Hey It's Saturday (Nine Network) from 1992 to 1999 also returning for the 2010 reunion shows. He has directed the Australian Film Institute Awards for SBS television and episodes of Dancing with the Stars (Australian TV series) and the Good Friday Appeal for the Seven Network and was Musical Director of Australia's Got Talent Series 1. He has arranged for the television shows Australian Idol, Young Talent Time and Carols by Candlelight.

He has orchestrated and conducted movie scores including The Truman Show, Death Defying Acts, Beneath Hill 60, Hating Alison Ashley, Bootmen and Two Hands plus the Olympic and Commonwealth Games themes for the Seven Network. He has composed music used in the films Love and Other Catastrophes and Summer Coda. He arranged the Collingwood Football Club and St Kilda Football Club theme songs for the Melbourne Symphony Orchestra's performance at the 2010 AFL Grand Final. Artists to use his arrangements include Ray Charles, Randy Crawford, John Farnham, Tom Jones, Joe Cocker, Barry Manilow and BB King.  He has been musical director for Kate Ceberano, Rhonda Burchmore, Debra Byrne the Victoria Police Showband. Daryl is currently the Program Leader for Contemporary Performance at the Australian Institute of Music in Melbourne, regularly adjudicates at the Melbourne School Bands Festival and has lectured in orchestration and arranging at the Victorian College of the Arts and the Defence Force School of Music (Australia).

Discography

Albums

References

External links 
Daryl McKenzie at the Internet Movie Database
Daryl McKenzie at Jazz Australia (www.jazz.org.au)
Daryl McKenzie at All About Jazz
Daryl McKenzie's homepage
Daryl McKenzie Jazz Orchestra on Myspace
Daryl McKenzie Jazz Orchestra on Facebook

1962 births
Australian composers
Australian trombonists
Living people
21st-century trombonists